Waitākere Ranges Local Board is one of the 21 local boards of the Auckland Council, and is one of the two boards overseen by the council's Waitākere Ward councillors.

The board's administrative area includes the suburbs of Titirangi, Glen Eden and Konini and the towns of Te Henga (Bethells Beach), Piha, Karekare, Huia and Laingholm, and covers the area from Waitākere Ranges to O'Neill Bay. The total population residing in the board's area, in the 2013 New Zealand census, was 48,396.

The board is governed by six board members elected at-large. The inaugural members were elected in the nationwide 2010 local elections, coinciding with the introduction of the Auckland Council.

Demographics

Waitākere Ranges Local Board Area had a population of 52,095 at the 2018 New Zealand census, an increase of 3,696 people (7.6%) since the 2013 census, and an increase of 6,597 people (14.5%) since the 2006 census. There were 17,262 households, comprising 25,887 males and 26,205 females, giving a sex ratio of 0.99 males per female. The median age was 36.8 years (compared with 37.4 years nationally), with 11,337 people (21.8%) aged under 15 years, 9,933 (19.1%) aged 15 to 29, 25,434 (48.8%) aged 30 to 64, and 5,388 (10.3%) aged 65 or older.

Ethnicities were 74.5% European/Pākehā, 12.7% Māori, 11.7% Pacific peoples, 14.0% Asian, and 3.0% other ethnicities. People may identify with more than one ethnicity.

The percentage of people born overseas was 29.8, compared with 27.1% nationally.

Although some people chose not to answer the census's question about religious affiliation, 54.0% had no religion, 30.8% were Christian, 0.6% had Māori religious beliefs, 2.9% were Hindu, 1.4% were Muslim, 1.1% were Buddhist and 2.6% had other religions.

Of those at least 15 years old, 11,430 (28.0%) people had a bachelor's or higher degree, and 5,217 (12.8%) people had no formal qualifications. The median income was $38,500, compared with $31,800 nationally. 9,354 people (23.0%) earned over $70,000 compared to 17.2% nationally. The employment status of those at least 15 was that 22,473 (55.1%) people were employed full-time, 6,027 (14.8%) were part-time, and 1,485 (3.6%) were unemployed.

Current Term Board Members 2019 Election
The current 2019 Board members are
Greg Presland (Chair), Future West
Ken Turner, WestWards
Sandra Coney, Future West 
Michelle Clayton, WestWards
Mark Allen, FutureWest
Saffron Toms Future West

2019 election results 
1. PRESLAND, Greg Future West 6556

2. TURNER, Ken - WestWards 6242

3.  CONEY, Sandra - Future West 6067

4.  TOMS, Saffron - Future West 5603

5.  ALLEN, Mark - Future West  5448

6. CLAYTON, Michelle WestWards-Independent 5350

HENDERSON, Neil Future West 5317

ROBERTS, Mark Future West 4964

POTAUAINE, Linda WestWards 4462

KELLY, Cheryl  WestWards-Independent 4139

CATHCART, Angus WestWards 3835

DEMPSTER, Dave WestWards 2760

SHEPHERD, Christine Independent 2451

HARTNETT, Tony Independent 2326

WINEERA, Michelle Independent 1506

Blank 729

2018 by-election results 
Ken Turner was the successful candidate in the by-election.
Michelle Clayton – Independent (2,103 votes)
Tiaria Fletcher – Future West (1,625 votes)
Rob Gore – (936 votes)
Ken Turner – WestWards (3,883 votes)

References

Local boards of the Auckland Region
West Auckland, New Zealand